Tuning can refer to:

Common uses
 Tuning, the process of tuning a tuned amplifier or other electronic component
 Musical tuning, musical systems of tuning, and the act of tuning an instrument or voice
 Guitar tunings
 Piano tuning, adjusting the pitch of pianos using a tuning fork or a frequency counter 
 Neuronal tuning, the property of brain cells to selectively represent a particular kind of sensory, motor or cognitive information
 Radio tuning
 Performance tuning - the optimization of systems, especially computer systems, which may include:
 Car tuning, an industry and hobby involving modifying automobile engines to improve their performance
 Engine tuning, the adjustment, modification, or design of internal combustion engines to yield more performance
 Computer hardware tuning
 Database tuning
 Self-tuning, a system capable of optimizing its own internal running parameters

Arts, entertainment, and media
 "Tuning", a song by Avail from their album Dixie (1994)
 Tuning, a psychokinetic ability in the film Dark City (1998)

See also
 Tune up (disambiguation)
 
 
 Tune (disambiguation)
 Tuner (disambiguation)